Aleksander Krawczuk (7 June 1922 – 27 January 2023) was a Polish historian and academic. He was a Minister of Culture from 1986 to 1989.

Krawczuk died on 27 January 2023, at the age of 100.

Publications 
 Kolonizacja sullańska, Ossolineum, Wrocław 1960
 Gajusz Juliusz Cezar, Ossolineum, Wrocław 1962
 Cesarz August, Ossolineum, Wrocław 1964
 Neron, Czytelnik, Warszawa 1965
 Herod, król Judei, Wiedza Powszechna, Warszawa 1965
 Perykles i Aspazja, Ossolineum, Wrocław 1967
 Siedmiu przeciw Tebom, PIW, Warszawa 1968
 Sprawa Alkibiadesa, Czytelnik, Warszawa 1968
 Kleopatra, Ossolineum, Wrocław 1969
 Wojna trojańska: Mit i historia, Wiedza Powszechna, Warszawa 1969
 Konstantyn Wielki, Wiedza Powszechna, Warszawa 1970
 Pan i jego filozof. Rzecz o Platonie, PIW, Warszawa 1970
 Ród Konstantyna, Wiedza Powszechna, Warszawa 1972
 Sennik Artemidora, Ossolineum, Wrocław 1972
 Tytus i Berenika, Czytelnik, Warszawa 1972
 Julian Apostata, Wiedza Powszechna, Warszawa 1974
 Rzym i Jerozolima, Czytelnik, Warszawa 1974
 Mity, mędrcy, polityka, PIW, Warszawa 1975
 Maraton, Wiedza Powszechna, Warszawa 1976
 Ostatnia olimpiada, Ossolineum, Wrocław 1976
 Upadek Rzymu. Księga wojen, Ossolineum, Wrocław 1978
 Starożytność odległa i bliska, "Pax”, Warszawa 1980
 Mitologia starożytnej Italii, Wydawnictwa Artystyczne i Filmowe, Warszawa 1982
 Ród Argeadów, Wyd. Literackie, Kraków 1982
 Stąd do starożytności, Wydawnictwa Radia i Telewizji, Warszawa 1985
 Poczet cesarzy rzymskich, Iskry, Warszawa 1986
 Opowieści o zmarłych. Cmentarz Rakowicki, KAW, Kraków 1987
 Groby Cheronei, Wyd. Poznańskie, Poznań 1988
 Alfabet Krawczuka mitologiczny, "Cracovia”, Kraków 1991
 Rzymianki, Polczek, Kraków 1992
 Poczet cesarzy bizantyjskich, Iskry, Warszawa 1992
 Kronika starożytnego Rzymu, Iskry, Warszawa 1994
 Kronika Rzymu i Cesarstwa Rzymskiego, Iskry, Warszawa 1997
 Poczet cesarzowych Rzymu, Iskry, Warszawa 1998
 Rzym, Kościół, cesarze, Iskry, Warszawa 2000
 Polska za Nerona, Iskry, Warszawa 2002
 Spotkania z Petroniuszem, Iskry, Warszawa 2005

References

Short biography

1922 births
2023 deaths
20th-century Polish historians
Polish male non-fiction writers
Culture ministers of Poland
Polish modern pagans
Writers from Kraków
Polish centenarians
Men centenarians
Democratic Left Alliance politicians
Members of the Polish Sejm 1991–1993
Members of the Polish Sejm 1993–1997
Grand Crosses of the Order of Polonia Restituta
Recipients of the Gold Medal for Merit to Culture – Gloria Artis
Jagiellonian University alumni
Academic staff of Jagiellonian University